Little Memole also known as Wee Wendy or , is a Japanese anime television series produced in the 1980s by Toei Animation.

Plot
A group of 245 inhabitants from a planet called Riruru make a crash landing onto Earth from their spaceship. This is due to a failure in the spaceship. Aboard the spaceship is a young tiny girl named Memole which the series is centered on.

The citizens of Riruru are cautious about trying to adapt to life on Earth because of their lilliputian size. However, this does not bother Memole. Memole is reckless and brave enough to venture with a group of friends into the city. Here she befriends a human girl named Mariel ("Muriel" in Wee Wendy), who because of her frail health, is forced to stay inside her house all of the time. After the initial surprise of seeing the little girl Memole, the two become inseparable, and their friendship grows throughout the series.

Memole also meets woodland animals and uses an owl named Bo-bo for transport.

Cast

Japanese
Toshio Furukawa - Ryukkuman
Junko Hori - Michelle (ep 34)
Reiko Katsura - Barbara
Chiyoko Kawashima - Popit
Kōhei Miyauchi - Riruru
Isao Nagahisa - Oscar
Ichirō Nagai - Forten
Kumiko Nishihara - Pi
Masaharu Satō - Cinthia's Father (ep 36)
Kazuko Sawada - Rupang
Kōzō Shioya - George, Koronbasu
Fuyumi Shiraishi - Grace
Isamu Tanonaka - Garagon
Kei Tomiyama - Berunaru
Naoko Watanabe - Memoru
Nana Yamaguchi - Penelope
Jouji Yanami - Mariel's dentist (ep 3), Monica's Grandfather (ep 35)
Yūsaku Yara - Torilone
Akie Yasuda - Marielle

English
Mr. Angelo
Cody Walker
Ginny Masters
Harry Metrano
Andrea Deschamps
Geoffrey Deschamps

External links
 Official Japanese site
 

1984 anime television series debuts
Toei Animation television
TV Asahi original programming
Toei Animation films